is a Japanese singer-songwriter and actor. He has been well known as frontman of the rock band Anzen Chitai that debuted in 1982 and enjoyed a successful career, particularly during the 1980s. In the 1990s, he also began his career as a solo artist. 
Widely regarded as one of the greatest Japanese vocalists, in 2014 he was ranked first by a panel of 200 experts for the best ever singing voice in Japan. Moreover, in 2021 Koji was voted as the greatest active male Japanese singer, with 190 experts agreeing that he is a "living national treasure of music" and that he portrays an "unparalleled mass of expressiveness and emotion which only seems to get better with age".

Biography
As a vocalist and a songwriter of the band, Tamaki spawned multiple successful compositions which were mostly co-written by lyricists including Gorō Matsui and Yōsui Inoue, by the time that the group suspended their career in 1993.

In 1987, Tamaki released the first solo single "All I Do", and continued his solo career after Anzen Chitai went into hiatus (1993–2001, 2004–2009). Throughout his solo career, he has released 23 singles and over a dozen studio albums. His song "Den-En" released as a single in 1996 became a massive hit, which reached the number-two on the Japanese Oricon charts and sold in excess of 900,000 copies.

Tamaki has also been known as an actor who has appeared in seven feature films and numerous television dramas. He has started acting career for the first time on "Prussian Blue no Shozo", the 1986 motion picture he starred.

He has been married three times; the second wife was actress Hiroko Yakushimaru (divorced in 1998), and the third spouse was keyboardist Satoko Ando, who had formerly worked on his albums and live tours (divorced in 2007). Tamaki also had an affair with actress Mariko Ishihara between 1983 and 1986. In her autobiography published in 2006, Ishihara confirmed her relationship with Tamaki two decades prior.

After Tamaki's retirement announcement due to health issues in 2008, Ishihara contacted Tamaki and the two began dating again. On February 25, 2009, Tamaki and Ishihara submitted their application for marriage in Tokyo. However, the application was not accepted and he split up with Ishihara after all. Anzen Chitai returned from a recess and released their new single "Aoi Bara/Wine Red no Kokoro (2010 version)" on March 3, 2010.

On his 2012 album Offer Music Box, Tamaki — who composed the original song — covered Yuki Saito's song "Kanashimi yo Konnichi wa", which was used as the first theme song for the anime television series Maison Ikkoku.

Discography

Studio albums

Live albums

Singles 
 "All I Do" (1987) – No. 10
  (1989) – No. 7
  (1989) – No. 12
 "I'm Dandy" (1989) – No. 10
  (1989) – No. 16
 "Call" (1993) – No. 22
  (1993) – No. 41
 "Love Song" (1994) – No. 35
 "Star" (1995) – No. 90
 "Melody" (1996) – No. 49
  (1996) – No. 2
 "Mr. Lonely" (1997) – No. 14
 "Rookie" (1998) – No. 49
 "Happy Birthday" (1998) – No. 69
  (1999) – No. 26
 "aibo" (2000) – No. 54
  (2001) – No. 96
  (2004) – No. 83
  (2005) – No. 35
  (2005) – No. 48
  (2005) – No. 13
 "Lion" (2006) – No. 60
  (2007) – No. 67

Filmography
Television
The Last Bullet (1995) – Ichiro Yamamura
Hideyoshi (1996) – Ashikaga Yoshiaki
Konna Koi no Hanashi (1997) – Konosuke Shimodaira
Furuhata Ninzaburō (1999) – Shūzō Utena

References

External links 
 Koji Tamaki's Official Website (in Japanese)

1958 births
Living people
People from Asahikawa
Japanese male singer-songwriters
Japanese singer-songwriters
Sony Music Entertainment Japan artists
Musicians from Hokkaido